Rabbi Yechiel Michel Tucazinsky
(1871–1955) was a halachic scholar and author who served as rosh yeshiva of the Etz Chaim Yeshiva in Jerusalem. He is best known for his work on the laws of mourning, Gesher HaChaim.

Biography
Yechiel Michel Tucazinsky was born on 27 December 1871 in Lyakhavichy, Belarus. 

His father died when he was 8; in 1882, Tucazinsky immigrated to Jerusalem, where he lived with his grandfather. There he studied in and later headed the Etz Chaim Yeshiva in Jerusalem. The yeshiva was subsequently run for over fifty years by his son Rabbi Nissan Aharon Tucazinsky.
 His wife was a great-granddaughter of Rabbi Shmuel Salant.

Tucazinsky was active in the foundation of new suburbs in Jerusalem, and favored the unification of all sections of the Jewish population.

He died on 31 March 1955 and is buried in the Sanhedria Cemetery of Jerusalem. The Jerusalem municipality honored his memory by naming the street Gesher HaChaim in the Mekor Baruch neighborhood after the title of his book.

In 1952, Tucazinsky was awarded the Rav Kook Prize from the Tel Aviv–Jaffa Municipality for Torah Literature.

Other works
Although best known for his work Gesher HaChaim and described as "one of the premier authorities on the Laws of Mourning", another cited work is his Hayomam BeKadur Ha'aretz, regarding The International Dateline in Jewish Law.

In 1904, Rabbi Tucazinsky initiated the annual Luach Eretz Yisrael calendar. 

He also authored:

 Ir HaKodesh V'Hamikdash - on Halachic issues related to Jerusalem and the Temple in Jerusalem
 Toharat Yisrael (c. 1910)
 Hilkhot Shevi'it (1910) on the laws of the Sabbatical Year
 Tekufat ha-Chamah u-Virkatah (1924) – on the solar cycle and the Birkat Hachama blessing
 Sefer Eretz Yisrael (1955) on laws and customs appertaining to Eretz Israel

References

Israeli rabbis
1872 births
1955 deaths